The McNamara–O'Hara Service Contract Act of 1965 (SCA), codified at , is a US labor law that requires government to use its bargaining power to ensure fair wages for workers when it buys services from private contractors.

Contents
The Act requires general contractors and subcontractors performing services on prime contracts in excess of $2,500 to pay service employees in various classes no less than the wage rates and fringe benefits found prevailing in the locality as determined by the United States Department of Labor, or the rates contained in a predecessor contractor's collective bargaining agreement. This is also known as the prevailing wage.

The SCA applies to every contract entered into by the United States or the District of Columbia, the principal purpose of which is to furnish services to the United States through the use of service employees.  The SCA requires contractors and subcontractors performing services on covered federal or District of Columbia contracts in excess of $2,500 to pay service employees in various classes no less than the monetary wage rates and to furnish fringe benefits found prevailing in the locality, or the rates (including prospective increases) contained in a predecessor contractor's collective bargaining agreement. Safety and health standards also apply to such contracts.

See also
US labor law
 Davis-Bacon Act
 Worker's compensation
 Minimum wage
 Living wage
 Prevailing wage

External links
Bush: Suspend Wage Rules for Service Workers Nathan Newman TPM Cafe September 14, 2005
 Bush: ‘I take responsibility’ Jim VandeHei and Jonathan Weisman Journal Gazette September 14, 2005
 "McNamara–O'Hara Service Contract Act - Employee Fringe Benefit Requirements"

1965 in law
United States federal government administration legislation
United States federal labor legislation